Casa Loma (Spanish for "Hill House") is an unincorporated community in Placer County, California. It lies at an elevation of 4032 feet (1229 m).

References

Unincorporated communities in California
Unincorporated communities in Placer County, California